Mesogobius is one of the genera of benthophiline gobiid fishes native to the basins of the Black and Caspian Seas.

Species
There are two or three recognized species in this genus:. 
 Mesogobius batrachocephalus (Pallas, 1814) (Knout goby)
 Mesogobius nigronotatus (Kessler, 1877) (? = M. nonultimus)
 Mesogobius nonultimus (Iljin, 1936)

References

 
Benthophilinae
Taxonomy articles created by Polbot